Genista corsica is a plant endemic to Corsica and Sardinia where it is associated with sunny open landscapes and poor stony soil. It is a common constituent of garrigue and maquis communities.

Description
Genista corsica is an erect or spreading intricately branched shrub with stout lateral spreading spines, 20–100 cm tall. Leaves inconspicuous, simple, elliptical and slightly hairy beneath. Flowers yellow 7–12 mm long. Calyx teeth as long as tube. Pod narrow-oblong, 12–20 mm long constricted between the seeds. Flowers from May to June. Exposed rocky and bushy slopes in lowland and lower mountains.

Gallery

References

La flore endémique de la Corse, Jacques Gamisans & Jean Francois Marzocchi, Edisud, 1996, 
Mediterranean Wild Flowers, Marjorie Blamey & Christopher Grey-Wilson, Harper Collins Publishers 1993, 
Wildflowers of Southern Europe, Paul Davies & Bob Gibbons, the Crowood Press 1993, 

corsica